The University of Antique  (UA), formerly the Polytechnic State College of Antique, is a state university in the Philippines.  It is mandated to provide higher technological, professional and vocational instruction and training in science, agricultural and industrial fields, as well as short-term technical or vocational courses. It is also mandated to promote research, advanced studies and progressive leadership in its areas of specialization.  Its main campus is in Sibalom, Antique.

UA was originally the Antique School of Arts & Trades (ASAT) which was established by virtue of Republic Act 857 sponsored by the late Congressman Tobias A. Fornier in 1954 with Mr. Fermin Taruc as its first Superintendent. Mr. Taruc was sent to Sibalom, Antique by the Bureau of Vocational Education to set up and construct the first buildings of ASAT.

References

State universities and colleges in the Philippines
Universities and colleges in Antique (province)